Mosbytoppane (earlier Mosbytoppen, sometimes anglicized as Mosby Peak), are two crags to the southwest of the caldera of the island of Bouvetøya. It was charted by the First Norvegia Expedition in 1927–28, under Captain Harald Horntvedt. It is named for Hakon Mosby, an oceanographer and meteorologist who was one of two scientists on the expedition.

References

Mountains of Bouvet Island